The 2005 German Athletics Championships were held at the Lohrheidestadion in Bochum-Wattenscheid on 2–3 July 2005.

Results

Men

Women

References 
 Results sources:
 Men: 
 Women: 

2005
German Athletics Championships
German Athletics Championships